The 1913 Liège–Bastogne–Liège was the eighth edition of the Liège–Bastogne–Liège cycle race and was held on 6 July 1913. The race started and finished in Liège. The race was won by Maurice Moritz.

General classification

References

1913
1913 in Belgian sport